Francesco Caramora was the master goldsmith who gave rise to the successful artistic and artisanal tradition in Valenza.

Caramora was born in Pavia in 1787. He learned the goldsmith's art in neighbouring Voghera and went into business with an uncle running a shop selling gold artefacts.

In 1817 he married Giuseppa Tremolada and moved to Valenza, a quiet agricultural village at the time, where he set up his own business as a master goldsmith.

In 1825 he registered the first mark in the history of Valenza goldsmithing at the Alessandria Trademark Office. The mark bore his initials separated by a drawing of the half-moon.

In 1826 he purchased a farm surrounded by land, just outside Valenza: he lived here, and we assume he also had part of his workshop here.

The building must be the “Goldsmith's Farm” we find recorded on the Napoleonic maps of 1875: in those days Francesco Caramora was the only goldsmith in Valenza,  so it is more than likely that the nondescript farm became known as the “casceina d’ urei”, the “goldsmith's farm” in local dialect.

By opening his workshop and training two apprentices, he started a process that transformed Valenza into the world-renowned City of Gold.

Francesco Caramora died prematurely in 1827, leaving insufficient assets to cover his debts. His estate was auctioned and was bought nearly entirely by his apprentice Piero Canti, who also took over from Francesco Caramora in his workshop. Continuing to establish Valenza's unique position in goldsmithing, he taught his art to other workers.

Sources 
Gioielli e gioiellieri di Valenza / Lia lenti. Allemandi, 1994 
Alle origini dell’oreficeria valenzana / Gian Isidoro De Piaggia. Published in the “Unindustria” magazine in 1991, and Valensa d’una vota no. 23-24
Valenza : in the maps of Fondo Carlo Dabene / Carlo Dabene, Ferruccio Quaroni, Riccardo Massola et al., 2010
Coeclerici : una storia di affari e di sogni / Pier Paolo Preti. – Milano : Libri Scheiwiller, 2004

1787 births
1827 deaths
Italian goldsmiths
People from Pavia